Richard Dale Jenkins (born May 4, 1947) is an American actor who is well known for his portrayal of deceased patriarch Nathaniel Fisher on the HBO funeral drama series Six Feet Under (2001–2005). He began his career in theater at the Trinity Repertory Company and made his film debut in 1974. He has worked steadily in film and television since the 1980s, mostly in supporting roles. He is also known for his roles in the films Burn After Reading (2008), Step Brothers (2008), Let Me In (2010), Jack Reacher (2012), The Cabin in the Woods (2012), The Shape of Water (2017), The Last Shift (2020), and The Humans (2021).

Jenkins was nominated for the Academy Award for Best Actor for the drama film The Visitor (2007). He won the Primetime Emmy Award for Outstanding Lead Actor in a Miniseries or a Movie for the limited drama series Olive Kitteridge (2014). For his performance in the fantasy drama film The Shape of Water (2017), he was nominated for the Academy Award, Golden Globe and Screen Actors Guild Award for Best Supporting Actor.

Early life
Jenkins was born and raised in DeKalb, Illinois. His mother, Mary Elizabeth (née Wheeler), was a housewife, and his father, Dale Stevens Jenkins, was a dentist. He attended DeKalb High School. Before he was an actor, Jenkins drove a linen truck (his boss was actor John C. Reilly's father). He earned a degree in drama from Illinois Wesleyan University before relocating to Rhode Island.

Career

Theatre
Jenkins worked with the Trinity Repertory Company in Providence, Rhode Island, while breaking into film with a bit part in Feasting with Panthers (1974), a television film about Oscar Wilde. When he was given the option of joining the Screen Actors Guild, he accepted immediately. He continued as a member of Trinity's resident acting company and served as its artistic director from 1990 to 1994.

Film
Since his debut in the television movie Feasting with Panthers (1974), Jenkins has worked steadily in film. His earlier film credits include Silverado (1985), Hannah and Her Sisters (1986), The Witches of Eastwick (1987), Sea of Love (1989), Blue Steel (1990), How to Make an American Quilt (1995), Flirting with Disaster (1996), and Snow Falling On Cedars (1999).

He has worked with the director siblings the Farrelly brothers in There's Something About Mary (1998), Outside Providence (1999), Me, Myself & Irene (2000), Say It Isn't So (2001) and Hall Pass (2011). He has also appeared in three Coen Brothers movies: The Man Who Wasn't There (2001), Intolerable Cruelty (2003), and Burn After Reading (2008). He is in North Country (2005), has three memorable scenes as FBI Director James (Robert) Grace in The Kingdom (2007), and Step Brothers (2008).

Although primarily known for supporting parts, Jenkins had a lead role in The Visitor (2007) for which he was nominated for the Independent Spirit Award and an Academy Award for Best Actor. Jenkins won the International Press Academy's Satellite Award for Best Actor – Motion Picture.

In 2010, Jenkins costarred in Dear John, as the father of John Tyree (Channing Tatum), and also co-starred with Julia Roberts and Javier Bardem in Eat Pray Love. In 2012, he appeared in the Joss Whedon and Drew Goddard horror film The Cabin in the Woods and the action film Jack Reacher. He then appeared in the action films White House Down (2013) and Kong: Skull Island (2017).

Jenkins co-starred in Guillermo del Toro's fantasy romance drama film The Shape of Water (2017), for which he received critical acclaim. For his performance, he garnered Academy Award, Golden Globe and Screen Actors Guild Award nominations for Best Supporting Actor.

Television
Jenkins is perhaps best known on television for playing Nathaniel Fisher in the HBO drama series Six Feet Under. His character is the deceased patriarch of the Fisher family and regularly appears to his family as a ghost or in dreams. He played the role for the show's entire run. He and his castmates received a Screen Actors Guild Award for Outstanding Performance by an Ensemble in a Drama Series in 2002.

Jenkins portrayed a DEA agent in one episode of Miami Vice and a mob boss in a later episode.

In 2015, Jenkins won the Primetime Emmy Award for Outstanding Lead Actor in a Miniseries or Movie for his performance as Henry Kitteridge in the HBO miniseries Olive Kitteridge.

In 2022, Jenkins portrayed Lionel Dahmer, father of notorious serial killer Jeffrey Dahmer, in Netflix's limited series Dahmer – Monster: The Jeffrey Dahmer Story. Starring alongside Evan Peters and Molly Ringwald, Jenkins appears in all ten episodes of the series created by Ryan Murphy. His performance was described in The New Yorker as "brilliant."

Personal life
Jenkins is married to choreographer Sharon R. Friedrick, with whom he has two children.

Awards and honors
In 2014, Jenkins and his wife Sharon received the Pell Award for Lifetime Achievement from Trinity Repertory Company in Providence.

Filmography

Film

Television

References

External links 

 
 Interview with Richard Jenkins at everydayyeah.com
 Richard Jenkins interview by Davy Rothbart for Grantland
 Richard Jenkins interview at The Faster Times, Davi Napoleon's Theater Talk

1947 births
Living people
Male actors from Rhode Island
American male film actors
American male stage actors
American male television actors
American male voice actors
Audiobook narrators
People from DeKalb, Illinois
People from Cumberland, Rhode Island
Male actors from Illinois
20th-century American male actors
21st-century American male actors
Outstanding Performance by a Lead Actor in a Miniseries or Movie Primetime Emmy Award winners
Actors from Providence, Rhode Island